Cherry Grove is an unincorporated community in Washington County, Oregon, United States. Cherry Grove is situated on the north bank of the Tualatin River near where it exits the Northern Oregon Coast Range and enters Patton Valley.

Cherry Grove was founded by Swedish immigrant August Lovegren in 1911. He had previously operated a lumber mill in Preston, Washington, after arriving in the United States in 1883. He wanted a name for the community that was connected with fruit growing, but his choice of "Appleton" was already taken by a place in Oregon. His cousin then suggested the name of her home of Cherry Grove, Minnesota.

Lovegren established a sawmill in the community and in September 1911 began operating a private electricity grid in Cherry Grove. He used the sawmill's boiler in the operation, and in September 1913 completed a dam on the Tualatin River to create a large log retention pond. In January 1914, a flood destroyed both the dam and the boiler, leaving the community without electricity until Portland General Electric added service in 1935. Cherry Grove's post office ran from 1912 through 1959 when service was transferred to Gaston.

Demographics

References

Further reading
Nixon, Birgetta & Mabel Tupper. Cherry Grove - A history from 1852 - 1977 (Cherry Grove, Oregon: 1977)
Bilderback, Ken & Kris. Creek with No Name: How the West was Won (and Lost) in Gaston, Oregon  (Gaston, Oregon: 2011)

External links
Historic photos of Cherry Grove from Salem Public Library
Information about Cherry Grove and the Willamette Valley & Coast Railway from Abandoned Railways of the Pacific Northwest
Cherry Grove history from VanNatta Forestry
Several images of the falls on the Tualatin River above Cherry Grove from the Oregon State University Archives
  

Swedish-American culture in Oregon
Unincorporated communities in Washington County, Oregon
1911 establishments in Oregon
Unincorporated communities in Oregon